Arnaud Clément and Michaël Llodra were the defending champions, and won in the final 5–7, 6–3, [10–8], against Mariusz Fyrstenberg and Marcin Matkowski.

Seeds

Draw

Draw

External links
Draw

Doubles